This article contains persons named in the Bible, specifically in the Hebrew Bible and Old Testament, of minor notability, about whom little or nothing is known, aside from some family connections.

L

Laadah
Laadah (Hebrew: לאדה) is one of the sons of Shelah, son of Judah (son of Jacob) in 1 Chronicles 4:21.

Laadan
See Libni

Ladan
See Libni

Lael
Lael (Hebrew לָאֵל "belonging to God") was a member of the house of Gershon according to Numbers 3:24. He was the father of Eliasaph.

Lahmi 
Lahmi, according to 1 Chronicles 20:5, was the brother of Goliath, killed by David's warrior Elhanan. See also Elhanan, son of Jair.

Laish 
This entry is about the individual named Laish. For the city Dan, known also as Laish, see Dan (ancient city).

Laish is a name which appears in 1 Samuel 25:44 and 2 Samuel 3:15, where it is the name of the father of Palti, or Paltiel, the man who was married to Saul's daughter Michal before she was returned to David.

Letushim 
Letushim appears as a son of Dedan according to Genesis 25:3.

Leummim 
Leummim was the third son of Dedan, son of Jokshan, son of Abraham by Keturah.

Libni
Libni (Hebrew לִבְנִי) was a son of Gershon of the house of Levi according to Exodus 6:17 and Numbers 3:18. He was born in Egypt. His descendants are referred to as the 'Libnites'.

Likhi 
Likhi son of Shemida is listed in a genealogy of the tribe of Manasseh. He is mentioned only in 1 Chronicles 7:19.

Lo-Ammi
Lo-Ammi (Hebrew for "not my people") was the youngest son of Hosea and Gomer. He had an older brother named Jezreel and an older sister named Lo-Ruhamah. God commanded Hosea to name him "Lo-Ammi" to symbolize his anger with the people of Israel (see Hosea 1:1–9).

Lo-Ruhamah
Lo-Ruhamah (Hebrew for "not loved") was the daughter of Hosea and Gomer. She had an older brother named Jezreel and a younger brother named Lo-Ammi. Her name was chosen by God to symbolize his displeasure with the people of Israel (see Hosea 1:1–9).

M

Maadai 
Maadai, son of Bani is found in Ezra 10:34, in a list of men recorded as having married foreign women.

Maadiah 
Maadiah appears in a list of priests and Levites said to have accompanied Zerubbabel in Nehemiah 12:5.

Maai 
Maai (Hebrew: מָעַי) was a musician who was a relative of Zechariah, a descendant of Asaph. He is mentioned once, as part of the ceremony for the dedication of the rebuilt Jerusalem wall, where he was part of the group that processed southwards behind Ezra. His name is omitted in the Septuagint translation of the passage, as are the names of five other relatives of Zechariah mentioned in the same verse. The name is otherwise unattested. Blenkinsopp suggests that Maai is a diminutive nickname. Mandel proposes its Hebrew origin means "sympathetic".

Maaseiah 
Several men called Maaseiah (Hebrew מַעֲשֵׂיָה or מַעֲשֵׂיָהוּ maaseyah(u) "Work of YHWH") are mentioned in the Bible:
 One of the Levites whom David appointed as porter for the ark , 
 One of the "captains of hundreds" associated with Jehoiada in restoring king Jehoash to the throne 
 The "king's son", probably one of the sons of king Ahaz, killed by Zichri in the invasion of Judah by Pekah, king of Israel 
 One who was sent by king Josiah to repair the temple . He was governor (Heb. sar, rendered elsewhere in the Authorized Version "prince," "chief captain", chief ruler") of Jerusalem.
 The father of the priest Zephaniah , 
 The father of the false prophet Zedekiah 
 a priest, the father of Neriah , 
 The son of Shallum, "the keeper of the threshold" (Jeremiah 35:4) "may be the father of the priest Zephaniah mentioned in [Jeremiah] 21:1; 29:25; 37:3".
 One of the sons of Jeshua who had married a foreign wife during the exile.

Maasiai
Hebrew for "Worker of Yahweh", one of the priests resident at Jerusalem at the Captivity

Maaz
Maaz was one of the sons of Ram the firstborn of Jerahmeel. His brothers were: Jamin and Eker.

Maaziah
 Head of the twenty-fourth and final priestly course in David's reign, .

Machbanai
Hebrew for "Clad with a mantle", one of the Gadite heroes who joined David in the wilderness

Machbena 
Machbena or Machbenah, according to the only mention of him, in 1 Chronicles 2:49, was the son of Sheva the son of Caleb.

Machi
Machi of the tribe of Gad was the father of Geuel, a scout sent to Canaan prior to the crossing of the Jordan River according to Numbers 13:15.

Machnadebai 
Machnadebai is mentioned in the Hebrew Bible only once, in Ezra 10:40, where the name appears in a list of people alleged to have married foreign women.

Magpiash 
Magpiash, according to Nehemiah 10:20, was one of the men who signed a covenant between God and the people of Yehud Medinata.

Mahalath

 Mahalath, one of the wives of Esau, and a daughter of Ishmael. Thought to be the same as Basemath of Genesis 36.
She had three children: Jeush, Shamariah, and Zaham.

Mahali
Mahali (also Mahli) was a son of Merari of the house of Levi according to Exodus 6:19, born in Egypt.

Mahath
Hebrew for "Grasping"
 A Kohathite Levite, father of Elkanah (different from Elkanah the father of Samuel) 
 Another Kohathite Levite, of the time of Hezekiah.

Mahazioth
Heb. "Visions", a Kohathite Levite, chief of the twenty-third course of musicians ,

Maher-shalal-hash-baz
Maher-shalal-hash-baz ("Hurry to spoil!" or "He has made haste to the plunder!") was the second mentioned son of the prophet Isaiah (Isaiah 8.1–4). The name is a reference to the impending plunder of Samaria and Damascus by the king of Assyria. The name is the longest personal name in the bible.

Mahlah 
Mahlah is the name of two biblical persons:
 One of the daughters of Zelophehad, who with her four sisters brought a claim regarding inheritance before Moses.
 A child of Gilead's sister Hammolecheth and great-granddaughter of Manasseh. She had two siblings, Ishhod and Abiezer.

Mahol
The father of four sons  who were inferior in wisdom only to Solomon.

Malcam 
For the deity sometimes called Malcam, Malcham, or Milcom, see Moloch.

Malcam (King James Version spelling Malcham) son of Shaharaim appears only once in the Hebrew Bible in a genealogy of the Tribe of Benjamin.

Malchiel
Malchiel (Hebrew מַלְכִּיאֵל "my king is God") was a son of Beriah the son of Asher, according to Genesis 46:17 and Numbers 26:45. He was one of the 70 persons to migrate to Egypt with Jacob. According to 1 Chronicles 7:31, he was the ancestor of the Malchielites, a group within the Tribe of Asher.

Malchishua
Heb. "King of help" or "King of salvation", one of the four sons of Saul. He perished along with his father and brothers in the battle of Gilboa.

Malchiah
Malchiah (Hebrew: מלכיהו malkiyahu "God is my king") son of the king (Jeremiah 38:6), owner of the pit into which Jeremiah was thrown

Mallothi
A Kohathite Levite, one of the sons of Heman the Levite, and chief of the nineteenth division of the temple musicians

Malluch
There are two biblical figures named Malluch

 A Levite of the family of Merari 
 A priest who returned from Babylon,(),()

Manahath
Manahath is one of the sons of Shobal. His brothers names were: Ebal, Shepho, Onam, and Alvan.

Maon 

Marsena 
Added to that Marsena gave advices to King Ahasuerus.
You can also have a look for Carshena. There is the presumption that both counselors have Persian names.

Mash
Mash was a son of Aram according to  Genesis 10:23. In Arabic traditions, Mash is considered the father of Nimrod (not Nimrod bin Kush bin Kanan), who begot Kinan, who in turn begot another Nimrod, and the lattermost's descendants mixed with those of Asshur (i.e. Assyrians). Tse Tsan-Tai identifies his descendants with the indigenous peoples of Siberia.

Massa
Hebrew word meaning tribute or burden, one of the sons of Ishmael, the founder of an Arabian tribe; a nomadic tribe inhabiting the Arabian desert toward Babylonia.

Matred 
Matred, according to Genesis 36:39 and 1 Chronicles 1:50, was the mother-in-law of the Edomite king Hadad II.

Matri
Matri, of the Tribe of Benjamin, was an ancestor of Saul according to I Samuel 10:21. Matri's clan, or the family of the Matrites, was chosen, and, from them, Saul the son of Kish was chosen to be king. The family of the Matrites is nowhere else mentioned in the Hebrew Bible; the conjecture, therefore, is that Matri is probably a corruption of Bikri, i.e. a descendant of Becher.

Mattan
Mattan (Mathan in the Douay–Rheims translation) was a priest of the temple of Baal in Jerusalem who was killed during the uprising against Athaliah when King Azariah's remaining son, Jehoash, was appointed king of Judah.

Mattattah
Mattattah (KJV: Mattathah) was one of the descendants of Hashum mentioned in  along with Mattenai, Zabda, Eliphelet, Jeremai, Manasseh and Shimei who married foreign wives.

Matthanias 
Two men called Matthanias are mentioned in 1 Esdras, one each mentioned in 1 Esdras 9:27 and 9:31. In both passages, the parallel text in Ezra 10:26 and 10:30 contains the name Mattaniah.

Mehetabeel
Mehetabeel ("Whom God benefits" or "God causes good") was the father of Delaiah, and grandfather of Shemaiah, who joined Sanballat against Nehemiah.

Mehetabel
Mehetabel ("מהיטבאל") ("Whom God benefits" or "God causes good") was the wife of Hadad, one of the kings of Edom.

Mehir
Mehir son of Chelub appears in a genealogy of the Tribe of Judah in 1 Chronicles 4:11.

Mehujael

The name means "El (or) the god enlivens."

Mehuman
Faithful, one of the eunuchs whom Ahasuerus commanded to bring in Vashti.

Persian "مهمان signifies a stranger or guest"

Melatiah 
Melatiah the Gibeonite is a person who, according to Nehemiah 3:7, was responsible for rebuilding a portion of the wall of Jerusalem after the end of the Babylonian captivity.

Melech
King, the second of Micah's four sons ), and thus grandson of Mephibosheth. Also related to a southwest Asian god, see Melech

Melzar
Probably a Persian word meaning master of wine, i.e., chief butler; the title of an officer at the Babylonian court ,  who had charge of the diet of the Hebrew youths.  Daniel had a providential relationship of "favour and tender love" with Melzar.

Merab

Merab was the eldest of Saul's two daughters. She was offered in marriage to David after his victory over Goliath, but does not seem to have entered heartily into this arrangement. She was at length, however, married to Adriel of Abel-Meholah, a town in the Jordan valley, about 10 miles south of Bethshean (Beit She'an), with whom the house of Saul maintained an alliance. She had five sons, who were all put to death by the Gibeonites on the hill of Gibeah. Merab is also a common feminine name in Israel.

Meraiah
A chief priest, a contemporary of the high priest Joiakim (Neh 12:12).

Meraioth
 Father of Amariah, a priest of the line of Eleazar,. It is uncertain if he ever was the high priest.
 A priest who went to Jerusalem with Zerubbabel. He is called Meremoth in Neh 12:3.

Meremoth
A priest who returned from Babylon with Zerubbabel, to whom were sent the sacred vessels belonging to the temple. He took part in rebuilding the walls of Jerusalem (Neh 3:4).

Meres 
Meres is listed in Esther 1:14 as one of seven officials in the service of Ahasuerus.

Meshelemiah
A Levite of the family of the Korhites, called also Shelemiah,() He was a temple gate-keeper in the time of David.

Meshillemoth
Two men called Meshillemoth (in one case spelled Meshillemith) are mentioned in the Bible.
 The father of Berechiah, a member of the Tribe of Ephraim during the time when Pekah was king.
 A priest, the son of Immer. He is called "Meshillemoth" in 1 Chronicles 9:12.

Meshullam

See Meshullam

Meshullemeth
The wife of King Manasseh of Judah, and the mother of King Amon of Judah.

Methuselah
In , Methuselah ( – Məṯūšāʾēl) is a descendant of Cain, the son of Mehujael and the father of Lamech.

Mezahab
The father of Matred,(), and grandfather of Mehetabel, wife of Hadar, the last king of Edom.

Miamin 
See Mijamin

Mibhar
A Hagarene, one of David's warriors; called also Bani the Gadite.

Mibsam
 One of Ishmael's twelve sons, and head of an Arab tribe.
 A son of Simeon.

Mibzar
Mibzar was an Edomite clan (possibly named after an eponymous chieftain) mentioned in Genesis 36:31-43.

Michael
Michael (is the masculine given name that comes from Hebrew: מִיכָאֵל / מיכאל (Mīkhāʼēl, pronounced [miχaˈʔel]), derived from the question מי כאל mī kāʼēl, meaning "Who is like God?") is the name of 8 minor biblical individuals besides from the Archangel Michael.
Michael of the house of Asher was the father of Sethur, a scout sent to Canaan prior to the crossing of the Jordan River according to Numbers 13:13.
Michael was the oldest son of Izrahiah, a descendant of Issachar according to 1 Chronicles 7:1-3
Michael was the 6th son of Beriah the head of the family of those living in Aijalon and who drove out the inhabitants of Gath of the tribe of Benjamin.
Michael was a chief Gadite in Bashan.
Michael was a Manassite and one of David's mighty warriors in Ziklag.
Michael was an ancestor of Asaph as the son of Baaseiah and the father of Shimea as a Gershonite Levite.
Michael was the father of Omri, the leader of the tribe of Judah and the time of David.
Michael was one of the sons of King Jehoshaphat who was killed by Joram his brother in the process of being king.

Michaiah
Two men called Michaiah (Hebrew: מיכיה Mikayah "Who is like Yah?") are mentioned in the Bible:
 Michaiah, son of Imri (q.v.)
 Michaiah, the son of Gemariah, the son of Shaphan (Jeremiah 36:11), who heard Baruch's reading of the oracles of YHVH to Jeremiah, and reported to king Johoiakim

Michri
"Prize of Jehovah" or "Selling", a Benjamite, the father of Uzzi.

Mijamin
Three men called Mijamin (also spelled Miamin, Miniamin, Minjamin) ("from the right hand") are mentioned in the Bible:
 The head of the sixth of twenty four priestly divisions set up by King David. (1 Chronicles 24:9)
 A chief priest who returned from Babylon with Zerubbabel (Nehemiah 12:5), who signed the renewed covenant with God. In the time of Joiakim his family had joined with that of Moadiah, and was led by Piltai. He was also called Miniamin.

Mikloth

 An officer under Dodai, in the time of David and Solomon.
 A Benjamite,(),.

Milalai
A Levitical musician who took part in the dedication of the wall of Jerusalem.

Miniamin 

Miniamin (or Mijamin) was one of the agents appointed under Kore in the time of King Hezekiah to distribute a share of the plenty to the priests in the Levitical cites of Judah (.

Minjamin 
See Mijamin

Mishael
Two men called Mischael (Hebrew מִישָׁאֵל 'Who is like God (El)?') are mentioned in the Bible:

Mishael was a son of Uzziel of the house of Levi according to Exodus 6:22, born in Egypt. He was a nephew of Amram and a cousin of Aaron, Miriam, and Moses.
He and Elzaphan were asked by Moses to carry away Nadab's and Abihu's bodies to a place outside the camp. (Leviticus 10:4)

Mishael was one of the three Hebrew youths  who were trained with Daniel in Babylon (Dan. 1:11, 19). He and his companions were cast into and miraculously delivered from the fiery furnace for refusing to worship the king's idol (3:13–30). Mishael's Babylonian name was Meshach.

Mishma 
Mishma, son of Simeon (1 Chron. 4:25–26).

Mishmannah
(Hebrew מִשְׁמַנָּה) one of the Gadite heroes who gathered to David at Ziklag.

Mithredath
() The Hebrew form of the Persian name Mithridates meaning 'given/dedicated to the sun'.
 The "treasurer" of King Cyrus.
 A Persian officer in Samaria.

Moab
Moab was the son of Lot and his eldest daughter. He became the father of the Moabites (see ).

Molid
(Hebrew מוֹלִיד)
 A son of Abishur of the tribe of Judah.

Moza
(Hebrew מוֹצָא)
 One of the sons of Caleb.
 The son of Zimri, of the posterity of Saul,().

Muppim
Muppim (Hebrew מֻפִּים) or Shuphim was the eighth son of Benjamin in Genesis 46:21 and Numbers 26:39.

Mushi
Mushi (Hebrew מוּשִׁי) was a son of Merari of the house of Levi according to Exodus 6:19, born in Egypt.

N

Naaman
Naaman is the fifth son of Benjamin in Genesis 46:21, but the son of Bela and therefore the grandson of Benjamin according to Numbers 26:38-40 and 1 Chronicles 8:4 He is not mentioned among the sons of Bela in 1 Chronicles 7:7.

Naarah

 Naboth 
Naboth was a minor figure known for owning a vineyard that king Ahab wished to have for himself. When Naboth was unwilling to give up the vineyard, Ahab's wife Jezebel instigated a plot to have Naboth killed. See .

Nadab
Nadab is the name of 4 biblical individuals

A son of Aaron and a High Priest mentioned many times in the Hebrew Bible.
Nadab a King of Israel and a son of Jeroboam I assasinated by Baasha of Israel.

 Naharai 
Naharai (or Nahari) the Beerothite is listed in 2 Samuel 23:37 and 1 Chronicles 11:39 as one of David's Mighty Warriors.

 Nahath 
Three men called Nahath appear in the Bible.
 Nahath, son of Reuel, son of Esau appears in a genealogy of the Edomites, found in Genesis 36:13 and repeated in 1 Chronicles 1:37. According to the Encyclopaedia Biblica, this Nahath is probably the same figure as the Naham of 1 Chronicles 4:19 and the Naam of 1 Chronicles 4:15.
 A Nahath appears in the ancestry of Samuel according to 1 Chronicles 6:26 (verse 11 in some Bibles).
 A Nahath appears in a list of Levite supervisors in the time of Hezekiah, in 2 Chronicles 31:13

Nahbi
Nahbi, the son of Vophsi of the house of Naphtali, was a scout sent to Canaan prior to the crossing of the Jordan River according to Numbers 13:14.

Naphish 
Naphish (once Nephish in the King James Version) is one of the sons of Ishmael. After him an Ishmaelite tribe is named. The name נפיש in Hebrew means "refreshed". His tribe is listed with Jetur, and is assumed to have resided nearby and lived a nomadic, animal-herding lifestyle in sparsely populated land east of the Israelites. Psalm 83, however lists these as Hagarites separately from the other 10 tribe which lived more southernly.

Naphtuhim
Naphtuhim is a son of Mizraim and grandson of Ham first mentioned in Genesis 10:13. According to the medieval biblical exegete, Saadia Gaon, his descendants inhabited the town of Birma (Al Gharbiyah region, Egypt), and were formerly known as Parmiin.

Neariah
Two men called "Neariah" appear in the Bible. Neariah the son of Shemaiah, was a descendant of David, and father of Elionenai (1 Chronicles 3:22). The other Neariah was, according to 1 Chronicles, a leader in the Tribe of Simeon (1 Chronicles 4:42).

Nebat
Nebat (Hebrew: נבט nebat "Sprout", Douay–Rheims: Nabat), an Ephraimite of Zereda, was the father of King Jeroboam.

Nebuzaradan 
Nebuzaradan (the biblical form of his name, derived from the Babylonian form Nabu-zar-iddin, meaning "Nabu has given a seed") was the captain of Nebuchadnezzar's bodyguard, according to the Bible.

Nedabiah 
Nedabiah, according to 1 Chronicles 3:18, was one of the sons of king Jeconiah.

Nehum 
See Rehum

Nehushta
Nehushta was the wife of King Jehoiakim and daughter of Elnathan ben Achbor of Jerusalem, according 2 Kings 24:8. She was also the mother of King Jehoiachin.

Nekoda
Nekoda was the ancestor of 652 Jews who returned from Babylonia with Ezra, but were declared ineligible to serve as Kohanim (priests) because they could not prove that their ancestors had been Kohanim. This is recounted in Ezra 2:48,60 and in Nehemiah 7:50, 62, where the number of men is given as 642.

Nemuel
Two men called Nemuel are mentioned in the Bible:
 The son of Eliab of the Tribe of Reuben according to Numbers 26:9.
 Jemuel, a son of Simeon.

Nepheg
Two men called Nepheg are mentioned in the Bible:
 A son of Izhar of the house of Levi according to Exodus 6:21, born in Egypt.  He was a nephew of Amram and a cousin of Aaron, Miriam, and Moses.
 A son of David according to 2 Samuel 5:15.

Nephish 
See Naphish

Ner
Ner (Hebrew: "Candle") was an uncle of Saul and the father of Abner according to I Samuel 14:50.

Nethaniah
Nethaniah, son of Asaph, was one of the musicians appointed by David for the musical service of the Temple (1 Chronicles 25:2, 12).

Noadiah
Nehemiah calls on God to "remember" her, or in the King James Version, to "think thou upon [her]".

Nobah
Nobah, of the Tribe of Manasseh defeated the Amorites, took the villages of Kenath and renamed it Nobah according to Numbers 32:42.

Nogah
Nogah, a son of David, appears in two lists of David's sons: 1 Chronicles 3:7 and 1 Chronicles 14:6.

O

Obadiah
Obadiah was a descendant of David, father of  Sheconiah, and son of  Arnan

Obal
Obal, also Ebal, was a son of Joktan according to Genesis 10:28, 1 Chronicles 1:22.

Obed

Obil
Obil was an Ishmaelite, a keeper of camels in the time of David, according to 1 Chronicles 27:30.

Ocran
Ocran was a member of the house of Asher according to Numbers 1:13. He was the father of Pagiel.

On
On, the son of Peleth, of the Tribe of Reuben, was a participant in Korah's rebellion against Moses according to Numbers 16:1. On is referred to as "Hon" in the Douai Bible translation. He is mentioned alongside Korah, Dathan and Abiram as the instigators of the rebellion, but not referred to later when Korah, Dathan and Abiram were challenged and punished for their rebellion.

Onam
Onam was the name of 2 biblical figures:

Onam one of the sons of Shobal.
Onam the son of Jerahmeel and the step-brother of his brothers. His mother was named Atarah .

Ophir
Ophir was a son of Joktan according to Genesis 10:29, 1 Chronicles 1:23.

Oren
Oren was a son of Jerahmeel according to 1 Chronicles 2:25.

Ozem
Two men called Ozem (Hebrew אצם, 'oTsehM, "Urgency") appear in the Bible.
 The sixth son of Jesse and thus a brother of David.
 A son of Jerahmeel.

Ozni 
See Ezbon.

P

Pagiel
Pagiel (Hebrew פַּגְעִיאֵל) was a son of Ocran, a prince of the house of Asher and one of the leaders of the tribes of Israel, according to Numbers 1:13.

Palti
This is about the Palti mentioned in Numbers. For the other biblical Palti, see Palti, son of Laish.

Palti, the son of Raphu of the house of Benjamin, was a scout sent to Canaan prior to the crossing of the Jordan River according to Numbers 13:9.

Paltiel
This is about the Paltiel in the Book of Numbers. For the other Paltiel, see Palti, son of Laish.

Paltiel (Hebrew פַּלְטִיאֵל "delivered by God") was a prince of the tribe of Issachar, one of those appointed by Moses to superintend the division of Canaan among his tribe (Num. 34:26).

Parmashta
Parmashta appears briefly in Esther 9:9, where he is listed as one of the ten sons of Haman, who is the primary antagonist of the Book of Esther because of his desire to wipe out the Jews.

Parnach
Parnach was the father of Elizaphan, a prince of the Tribe of Zebulun. (Num. 34:25).

Parosh
Parosh also called Pharosh, was the name of at least 2 biblical individuals.
An ancestor of one of the families who returned from the exile with Zerubbabel and Ezra.

Parshandatha
Parshandatha, also Pharsandatha, was one of the ten sons of Haman. He was killed by a Jew or Jews (the account in the Book of Esther is unclear) and Esther had his corpse impaled (see ).

Paruah
Paruah is mentioned in 1 Kings 4:17 as the father of "Jehoshaphat son of Peruah", a governor governing the territory of the Tribe of Issachar under Solomon.

Paseah
Paseah is the name of two figures in the Hebrew Bible. In a genealogy of Judah, a Paseah appears (1 Chronicles 4:12) as the son of Eshton, the son of Mehir, the son of Chelub. Another Paseah is mentioned indirectly (Nehemiah 3:6) by way of his son Jehoiada, a repairer of a section of the wall of Jerusalem.

Pedahel
Pedahel Prince of the tribe of Naphtali; one of those appointed by Moses to superintend the division of Canaan amongst the tribe (Num. 34:28).

Pedahzur
Pedahzur was a member of the house of Manasseh according to Numbers 1:10. He was the father of Gamaliel.

Pelaiah
Two men called Pelaiah are mentioned in the Bible. In 1 Chronicles 3:23, a Pelaiah appears in a genealogy. He is listed as one of the sons of Elioenai, the son of Neariah, the son of Shemaiah, the son of Shechaniah. The other Pelaiah appears in Nehemiah (8:7; 10:10) as a Levite who helped to explain biblical law to the inhabitants of Yehud Medinata and signed a document against intermarriage between Jews and non-Jews.

Pelaliah

Pelaliah (Hebrew Pĕlalyāh) is mentioned in Nehemiah 11:12, which lists a descendant of his as a priestly leader in Jerusalem. The descendant is specified as "Adaiah son of Jeroham son of Pelaliah son of Amzi son of Zechariah son of Pashhur son of Malchiah."

Pelatiah
Pelatiah (Hebrew: פלטיהו Pelatyahu, meaning "whom Jehovah delivered")  the son of Benaiah, a prince of the people (Ezekiel 11:1), was among the 25 men who Ezekiel saw at the East Gate of the temple. He fell dead upon hearing the prophecy regarding Jerusalem (Ezekiel 11:13).

Another Pelatiah appears as being the son of Hananiah the son of Zerubbabel.

The last Pelatiah is one of the people mentioned in  who sealed the covenant.

Pelet
Pelet was one of the sons of Azmaveth, according to 1 Chronicles 12:3, who supported King David at Ziklag.

Peleth
There are 2 biblical individuals named Peleth

Peleth, of the Tribe of Reuben, was the father of On, a participant in Korah's rebellion against Moses according to Numbers 16:1.
Peleth one of the sons of Jonathan the son of Jada, and the brother of Zaza.

Peresh 
According to 1 Chronicles 7:16, Peresh was the son of Machir, the son of Manasseh.

Pethahiah
Three men called Pethahiah are named in the Bible.
 A levite, mentioned in Nehemiah 10:23 and Nehemiah 9:5.
 Pethahiah ben Meshezabel, who was one of the "sons of Zerah" of the Tribe of Judah.
 Pethahiah was one of the priest in the temple service ordained by David.

Pethuel
Pethuel, the father of Joel, in Joel 1:1.

Peulthai
Peulthai, according to 1 Chronicles 26:5, was the eighth of Obed-edom's eight sons. The passage in which they are listed records gatekeepers of the temple at Jerusalem.

Phallu 
Phallu or Pallu was a son of Reuben according to Genesis 46:9, Exodus 6:14 and Numbers 26:5. He was one of the 70 souls to migrate to Egypt with Jacob.

Phalti 
For the individual called "Phalti" in the King James Bible, see Palti, son of Laish.

Phaltiel 
For the individual called "Paltiel" in the King James Bible, see Palti, son of Laish.

Phurah
Phurah was a servant of Gideon in Judges 7. Gideon takes Phurah with him to spy on the Midianites before battle.

Phuvah
Phuvah or Pua was a son of Issachar according to Genesis 46:13 and Numbers 26:23. He was one of the 70 souls to migrate to Egypt with Jacob.

Pildash 
Pildash was the son of Nahor and Milcah.

Pinon 
Pinon is listed as one of the "chiefs" of Edom, in Genesis 36:41, and, in a copy of the same list, in 1 Chronicles 1:52.

Piram 
Piram, according to Joshua 10:3, was the king of Jarmuth.

Pochereth-hazzebaim
Pochereth-hazzebaim was one of Solomon's servants whose descendants returned from the exile with Zerubbabel. He was the head of a family who returned from Babylon. The King James Version has his name modified into Pochereth of Hazzebeim but of was not in 1611 edition of the KJV. In 1 Esdras 5:34 he is called Phacareth.

Poratha 
Poratha, according to Esther 9:8, was one of the ten sons of Haman, the antagonist of the Book of Esther who attempted to wipe out the Jewish people.

Pul
Pul was an abbreviation for the Assyrian king Tiglath-Pileser III.  Pul attacked Israel in the reign of Menahem and extracted tribute.  II Kings 15:19

Putiel
Putiel was the father of Eleazar's wife according to Exodus 6:25. According to Rashi this was another name of Jethro.

R

Raamiah 
Raamiah (Hebrew רַעַמְיָה) is one of the princes who returned from the Exile (Neh. 7:7). He is also called Reelaiah in Ezra 2:2.

Rabmag
Rabmag (Hebrew רַב־מָג, from Assyrian "Rab-mugi") was a "chief physician" attached to the king of Babylon (Jeremiah 39:3,13).

Raddai
Raddai, according to 1 Chronicles 2:14, was one of the brother of King David.

Rakem
See Rekem.

Ramiah
Ramiah, according to Ezra 10:25, was an Israelite layperson, a member of the group named "sons of Parosh", who was guilty of marrying a foreign woman.

Rapha
Rapha, according to the Septuagint version of 2 Samuel 21:16, was the parent of Jesbi, the name in that version for the giant referred to in the Massoretic text as Ishbi-benob. In the Latin Vulgate he is referred to as Arapha or Arafa.

Raphu
Raphu of the house of Benjamin was the father of Palti, a scout sent to Canaan prior to the crossing of the Jordan River according to Numbers 13:9.

Rechab
Rechab ( Rēḵāḇ) is the name of three men in the Bible:

One of the two "captains of bands" whom Saul's son Ish-bosheth took into his service, and who conspired to kill him. (2 Samuel 4:2) 
A Kenite, mentioned as the father of Jehonadab at King Jehu's time, from whom the tribe of the Rechabites derived their name. Jehonadab and his people had all along become worshippers of God.
The father of Malchiah, ruler of part of Beth-haccerem. (Nehemiah 3:14)

Regem 
Regem is named in 1 Chronicles 2:47 as one of the sons of Jahdai, a figure who appears in a genealogy associated with Caleb.

Regem-melech 
A figure called Regem-melech, along with a "Sharezer", came, according to some interpretations of  Zechariah 7:2, to Bethel to ask a question about fasts. It is unclear whether the name is intended as a title or as a proper name. The grammar of the verse is difficult and several interpretations have been proposed.

Rehabiah
Rehabiah is a figure mentioned three times in the Hebrew Bible, as the ancestor of a group of Levites. He is identified as the son of Eliezer the son of Moses (1 Chronicles 23:17; 26:25). Chronicles identifies him as the father of a person named Isshiah (Hebrew Yiššiyāh, 1 Chronicles 24:21) or Jeshaiah (Hebrew Yĕshaʿyāhû, 1 Chronicles 26:25).

Rehob
Rehob (Hebrew: רחב which can be translated into Rahab) was the name of 2 biblical figures:
The father of Hadadezer the king of Zobah and could possibly be the predecessor of Hadadezer.

Rehum 
Rehum refers to four or five biblical figures.
 A Rehum is mentioned in Ezra 2:2, who is called Nehum in Nehemiah 7:7. He appears in passing, in two copies of a list of people said to have come from Persia to Yehud Medinata under the leadership of Nehemiah. He may be the same individual mentioned in Nehemiah 12:3.
 A Rehum is mentioned in Nehemiah 12:3, where he is listed as part of a group of priests associated with Zerubbabel.
 Rehum son of Bani, a Levite, appears in a list of people who contributed to building Nehemiah's wall in Nehemiah 3:17.
 Rehum, a member of a group of priests associated with Zerubbabel according to Nehemiah 12:3.
 Rehum was an official, according to Ezra 4:8–23, who along with collaborators opposed the Jewish attempt to rebuild Jerusalem.

Rephaiah
Rephaiah is the name of 3 biblical figures:

Rephaiah (Hebrew רְפָיָה "the Lord has healed"), a descendant of David was the father of Arnan and the son of  Jeshaiah.
Rephaiah the son of Hur the ruler of the half part of Jerusalem according to the Book of Nehemiah.
Rephaiah the son of Binea and the father of Eleasah, also called Rapha.

Reba
Reba was one of five Midianite kings killed during the time of Moses by an Israelite expedition led by Phinehas, son of Eleazar according to Numbers 31:8 and Joshua 13:21.

Rekem
This is about individuals in the Bible named Rekem. For the city by that name, see List of minor biblical places § Rekem.

Rekem (Hebrew רֶקֶם) refers to more than one individual in the Hebrew Bible:
 Rekem was one of five Midianite kings killed during the time of Moses by an Israelite expedition led by Phinehas, son of Eleazar according to Numbers 31:8 and Joshua 13:21. Josephus identifies Rekem with the king who built Petra, a city later associated with the Nabateans. He indicates that in his time the local population still called it Rekem after this founder, and in fact, according to modern scholarship the Nabateans themselves referred to it by this name RQM (רקם) in the Aramaic alphabet they used, spelled identically as the Biblical name.
 According to 1 Chronicles 2:43–44, Hebron, a figure associated with the biblical Caleb, was the father of a person named Rekem.
 According to 1 Chronicles 7:16, Machir the son of Manasseh was the ancestor of a figure named Rekem. In this last passage, the King James Version spells the name as Rakem.

Rephael 
In , Rephael was one of Shemaiah's sons. He and his brethren, on account of their "strength for service," formed one of the divisions of the temple porters.

Reumah 
Reumah, according to Genesis 22:24, was the concubine of Abraham's brother Nahor, and the mother of his children Tebah, Gaham, Tahash, and Maachah.

Rezon

According to I Kings 11:23–  Rezon (Hebrew: רזון Rezon) became regent in Damascus and was an adversary of Solomon.

Ribai
Ribai, a Benjamite of Gibeah, was the father of Ittai, one of King David's Warriors (2 Samuel 23:29, 1 Chronicles 11:31).

Rinnah
Rinnah appears once in the Bible, as the son of a man named Shimon (1 Chronicles 4:20) in a genealogy of Tribe of Judah. Neither Shimon's origin nor precise relationship to Judah is given.

Rohgah
In 1 Chronicles 7, Rohgah, also spelled Rohagah, was one of the sons of Shamer (the vocalization found in v. 34) or Shomer (the vocalization found in v. 32), who is identified as the son of Heber, the son of Beriah, the son of the tribal patriarch Asher.

Romamti-ezer
Romamti-ezer appears twice in the Hebrew Bible, both times in 1 Chronicles 25. In verse 4 he is identified as one of the fourteen sons of Heman, one of three men who according to Chronicles were assigned to be in charge of musical worship in the Temple of Jerusalem. Later in the chapter, 288 assigned to the musical service are divided into twenty-four groups of twelve. The twenty-fourth group is assigned to Romamti-ezer (verse 31).

Rosh
Hebrew: ראש rosh "Head"

Rosh is the seventh of the ten sons of Benjamin named in Genesis .

A nation named Rosh is also possibly mentioned in Ezekiel 38:2–3, 39:1 "Son of man, set your face toward Gog, the land of Magog, the prince of Rosh, Meshech, and Tubal; and prophesy concerning him." 

This translation "Rosh" is found in NASB but not in KJV and most modern versions. Also in a variant reading of Isaiah 66:19 (MT) and the Septuagint Jeremiah 32:23. Many scholars categorize this as a mistranslation of נְשִׂ֕יא רֹ֖אשׁ, nesi ro'š ("chief prince"), rather than a toponym . 

However, the three oldest translations of the Old Testament (The Septuagint, Theodotion and Symmachus) all transliterate the word "rosh" into the Greek in Ezekiel 38 and 39, thus treating it as a proper noun and suggesting they viewed this word as a toponym. Significantly, these same translations choose to translate and not transliterate the same Hebrew word into its Greek interpretations in other chapters (e.g. Ezekiel 40:1).

S

Sabtah
Sabtah(סַבְתָּ֥ה) was a son of Cush according to Genesis 10:7, 1 Chronicles 1:9.
Aubin mentions that sabtah in the biblical account in Genesis 10:6-7 (Table of Nations) is Taharqa's predecessor, Shebitku.

Sabtechah
Sabtechah(סַבְתְּכָ֑א) was a son of Cush according to Genesis 10:7, 1 Chronicles 1:9.
Aubin mentions that Sabtechah in the biblical account in Genesis 10:6-7 (Table of Nations) is Taharqa's predecessor, Shabako.

Sachar
Two men called Sachar (sometimes spelled Sacar or Sakar) are mentioned in the Bible:
 One of David's heroes 1 Chronicles 11:35; also called Sharar 2 Samuel 23:33.
 A son of Obed-Edom the Gittite, and a temple porter 1 Chronicles 26:4.

Sachia
Sachia (also Sakia) appears only in 1 Chronicles 8:10, where he is listed as one of the "sons" of Shaharaim. The King James Version spells the name Shachia.

Salu
Salu, of the house of Simeon, was the father of Zimri who was involved in the Heresy of Peor according to Numbers 25:14.

Saph
Saph is a figure briefly mentioned in a section of 2 Samuel which discusses four yelide haraphah killed by Israelites. According to 2 Samuel 21:18, a war broke out between Israel and the Philistines. During the battle, Sibbecai the Hushathite, one of David's Mighty Warriors, killed Saph, who was one of the four. The expression yelide haraphah is rendered several different ways in translations of the Bible: "the descendants of Rapha" (NIV, NLT), "the descendants of the giants" (ESV, NLT), "the descendants of the giant" (NASB, Holman), and "the sons of the giant" (KJV, ASV). While most interpreters the phrase as a statement about the ancestry of the four people killed, describing them as descended from giants, another interpretation takes the phrase as meaning "votaries of Rapha," in reference to a deity by that name to which a group of warriors would have been associated.

Saraph 
Saraph (Hebrew: שראף) was a descendant of Shelah, son of Judah. (1 Chronicles 4:21-23)

Sarsekim
Sarsekim, also spelled Sarsechim, is a name or title, or a portion of a name or title, which appears in Jeremiah 39:3. Jeremiah describes Babylonian officials, some named and the rest unnamed, who according to the text sat down "in the middle gate" of Jerusalem during its destruction in 587 or 586 BCE. The portion which explicitly gives the names and/or titles of the officials reads, in Hebrew, nrgl śr ʾṣr smgr nbw śr skym rb srys nrgl śr ʾṣr rb-mg. Various interpretations have divided the names in various ways. The King James Version, sticking closely to the grammatical indicators added to the text by the Masoretes during the Middle Ages, reads this as indicating six figures: "Nergalsharezer, Samgarnebo, Sarsechim, Rabsaris, Nergalsharezer, Rabmag". The New International Version sees three characters "Nergal-Sharezer of Samgar, Nebo-Sarsekim a chief officer, Nergal-Sharezer a high official." Versions featuring these three figures, with variations in the exact details of translations, include NLT and ESV. Four figures appear in the New American Standard Bible, "Nergal-sar-ezer, Samgar-nebu, Sar-sekim the Rab-saris, Nergal-sar-ezer the Rab-mag."

In 2007, a Babylonian Tablet was deciphered containing a reference to a "Nabu-sharussu-ukin," identified as referring to the biblical figure. See Nebo-Sarsekim Tablet.

Seba
Seba was a son of Cush according to Genesis 10:7, 1 Chronicles 1:9
The "tall men of Seba" (Good News Bible) are also referred to in Isaiah 45:14

Segub
There are two biblical individuals called Segub mentioned in the Bible.
One of the sons of Hezron through the daughter of Machir the son of Manasseh. He was also the father Jair and could possibly be Jair the judge of Israel, Segub also controlled twenty-three cities in Gilead.

Seled
According to 1 Chronicles 2:1–30, in the genealogical section which begins the book of Chronicles, Seled, who died childless, was the brother of Appaim and son of Nadab, the son of Shammai, the son of Onam, the son of Jerahmeel, the son of Hezron, the son of Perez, the son of Judah, the eponymous founder of the Tribe of Judah.

Semachiah
Semachiah (or Semakiah) appears in 1 Chronicles 26:7, in a genealogical passage concerning gatekeepers of the Jerusalem Temple. Semachiah is described as a son of Shemaiah, a son of Obed-Edom.

Sered
Sered was a son of Zebulun according to Genesis 46:14 and Numbers 26:26. He was one of the 70 souls to migrate to Egypt with Jacob. According to the verse in Numbers, he was the eponymous forefather of the clan of Sardites.

Sethur
Sethur, the son of Michael of the house of Asher, was a scout sent to Canaan prior to the crossing of the Jordan River according to Numbers 13:13.

Shaaph
Shaaph appears in the second chapter of 1 Chronicles. In one translation, these verses read as follows: "And the sons of Jahdai: Regem, and Jotham, and Geshan, and Pelet, and Ephah, and Shaaph. Maacah, Caleb's concubine, bore Sheber and Tirhanah. And [the wife of] Shaaph the father of Madmannah bore Sheva the father of Machbenah and the father of Gibea. And the daughter of Caleb was Achsah" (1 Chronicles 2:47–49).

The words [the wife of] do not occur in the Hebrew text, which reads literally, as Sara Japhet translates it, "And Shaaph the father of Madmannah bore Sheva . . ." but with a feminine form (watteled) of the verb "bore," rather than the expected masculine form wayyoled. Japhet outlines several possibilities as to how the text may originally have read.

Shaashgaz
Shaashgaz appears in the Hebrew Bible in Esther 2:14, where it is given as the name of the eunuch who was in charge of the "second house of the women".

Shabbethai
Shabbethai, a Levite who helped Ezra in the matter of the foreign marriages, probably the one present at Ezra's reading of the law, and possibly the Levite chief and overseer. The name might mean "one born on Sabbath", but more probably is a modification of the ethnic Zephathi (Zephathite), from Zarephathi (Zarephathite). Meshullam and Jozabad, with which Shabbethai's name is combined, both originate in ethnic names. (Encyclopaedia Biblica)

Shagee
Shagee (also spelled Shage or Shageh) is a figure who appears, indirectly, in one version of the list of David's Mighty Warriors.

In 1 Chronicles 11:34, a figure appears who is called "Jonathan the son of Shagee the Hararite." In 2 Samuel 23:32–33, the name "Jonathan" appears directly before the name "Shammah the Harodite", while in 2 Samuel 23:11 is found "Shammah the son of Agee the Hararite," who is the subject of a very brief story in which he fights with Philistines. The exact sort of copying error or deliberate abbreviation that may have led to this state of affairs is uncertain.

Shaharaim
Shaharaim was a member of the house of Benjamin.  He had three wives, Hushim, Baara, and Hodesh, according to 1 Chronicles 8:8–9.

Shamed

See Shemed.

Shamhuth
Shamhuth the Izrahite (Hebrew, Shamhut ha-Yizrah) is a figure mentioned in the list of military divisional captains in 1 Chronicles 27:8. The 27th chapter of 1 Chronicles gives the names of people who, according to the Chronicler, were in charge of 24,000-man divisions of David's military, each of which was on active duty for a month. Shamhuth was the commander for the fifth month of each year. Other Izrahites were mentioned in 1 Chronicles 26:29 in connection with duties outside Jerusalem.

Shamir
This is about the individual named Shamir. For the biblical place-name Shamir, see List of minor biblical places § Shamir.

Shamir appears in a list of Levite names (1 Chronicles 24:24).

Shammah 
See Shammah for several people by this name.

Shammai
Shammai (Hebrew: שִׁמִּי) was the name of at least 3 biblical individuals.
One of the sons of Onam according to 1 Chronicles 2:28, he also had two sons: Nadab and Abishur, he was also the brother of Jada.
A son of Rekem and the father of Maon, and a Jerahmeelite.
One of the children of Ezra in 1 Chronicles 4:17. He was also probably the same person as Shimon (q.v) ver. 20. The Septuagint suggest that Jether was the father of all three. Rabbi D. Kimchi speculates that the children in 1 Chronicles 4:17 were the children of Mered by his wife Bithiah, the daughter of Pharaoh.

Shammoth
According to 1 Chronicles 11:27, Shammoth the Harorite was one of David's Mighty Warriors. An entry in the corresponding list in Samuel contains Shammah the Harodite (2 Samuel 23:25). See Shammah.

Shammua
There are four individuals by the name of Shammua in the Hebrew Bible:
 Shammua, the son of Zaccur of the house of Reuben, was a scout sent to Canaan prior to the crossing of the Jordan River according to Numbers 13:4.
 One of David’s sons, mentioned in 2 Samuel 5:14 and 1 Chronicles 14:4.
 A Levite in the time of Nehemiah (11:17).
 A Levite in the time of Nehemiah (12:18).

Shamsherai
Shamsherai is mentioned once, in passing, in a long list of the "sons of Elpaal" within a genealogy of the Tribe of Benjamin (1 Chronicles 8:26).

Shapham
A figure named Shapham is mentioned in passing once in the Hebrew Bible, in a list of Gadites (1 Chronicles 5:12).

Shaphat
Shaphat, the son of Hori of the house of Simeon, was a scout sent to Canaan prior to the crossing of the Jordan River according to Numbers 13:5.

Also the name of one of King David's sons by Bathsheba.

Sharai
A Sharai is mentioned once in the Bible, in passing, in a list of the "sons of Bani" (Ezra 10:40).

Sharar

A Sharar is mentioned indirectly in 2 Samuel 23:33, where "Ahiam the son of Sharar the Hararite" is listed as one of David's Mighty Warriors. In 1 Chronicles 11:35, the same figure is referred to as Sacar (sometimes spelled Sakar or Sachar).

Sharezer
Sharezer, according to 2 Kings 19:37 and Isaiah 37:38, was one of the two sons of Sennacherib. He and his brother Adrammelech killed their father as he worshipped in the temple of Nisroch.

Shashai
A Shashai is listed in the Book of Ezra as a man who married a foreign wife (Ezra 10:40).

Shashak
Shashak or Sashak was a member of Benjamin's dynasty, mentioned in 1 Chronicles 8:14 and 25.

Sheariah
Sheariah, according to 1 Chronicles 8, was a descendant of King Saul, specifically one of the six sons of Azel (1 Chronicles 8:38), the son of Eleasah, the son of Raphah, the son of Binea, the son of Moza (v. 37), the son of Zimri, the son of Jehoaddah, the son of Ahaz (36), the son of Micah (35), the son of Merib-baal, the son of Jonathan (34), the son of Saul (33). He is also mentioned 1 Chronicles 9, which substantially repeats the same genealogy, except that chapter 9 reads Rephaiah instead of Raphah (v. 43) and Jadah instead of Jehoaddah (42).

Shearjashub
Shearjashub ( Šə'ār-yāšūḇ) is possibly the first-mentioned son of Isaiah according to Isaiah 7:3.
His name means "the remnant shall return" and was prophetic; offering hope to the people of Israel, that although they were going to be sent into exile, and their temple destroyed, God remained faithful and would deliver "a remnant" from Babylon and bring them back to their land.

However, Targum Pseudo-Jonathan, Rashi, and some modern translations interpret the phrase according to the Masoretic grammar of the Hebrew cantillation marks, which break the sentence into "u-sh'ar, yashuv b'nekha," "And the remnant, of your sons which will return," viz. a phrase and not a proper noun. Pseudo-Jonathan reads "and the rest of thy disciples, who have not sinned, and who are turned away from sin," and Rashi, "The small remnant that will return to Me through you, and they are like your sons." The Brenton Septuagint Translation and Douay–Rheims Bible translate the phrase "and thy son Jasub who is left," following the Masoretic grammar but assuming that "Jasub," "will return," is still a proper noun.

Sheconiah
Sheconiah was a descendant of David, father of Shemaiah, and son of  Obadiah.

Shechem
Shechem was the name of two individuals mentioned in the Bible:
 A prince of Shechem who defiled Dinah according to Genesis 34
 A son of Manasseh according to Numbers 26:31, Joshua 17:2, and 1 Chronicles 7:19.

Shedeur
Shedeur was a member of the house of Reuben according to Numbers 1:5. He was the father of Elizur.

Shelemiah
Shelemiah (Hebrew: שלמיהו) the son of Abdeel, along with two others, was commanded by king Jehoiakim to arrest Baruch the scribe and Jeremiah the prophet (Jeremiah 36:25).

Shelomi
Shelomi was the father of Ahihud, a prince of the Tribe of Asher. (Num. 34:27).

Shelumiel
Shelumiel (Hebrew: שלמיאל) was a son of Zurishaddai, a prince of the tribe of Simeon and one of the leaders of the tribes of Israel, according to Numbers 1:6.
Yiddish schlemiel, a term for a "hapless loser", is said to be derived from the name.

Shelomith
Shelomith was the name of 5 biblical individuals in the Hebrew Bible.
 A daughter of Dibri of the house of Dan, according to Leviticus 24:11. She was married to an Egyptian and her son (unnamed) was stoned to death by the people of Israel for blasphemy, following Moses' issue of a ruling on the penalty to be applied for blasphemy.
 A daughter of Zerubbabel during the exile.
 A Levite and a chief of the sons of Izhar in the time of David's death. Also called Shelomoth.
 The youngest child of Rehoboam through Maachah. It is uncertain whether he was a son or daughter.
 Shelomith, with the son of Josiphiah returned from Babylon with Ezra with 80 male individuals. There appears, however, to be an omission, which may be supplied from the Sept., and the true reading is probably "Of the sons of Bani, Shelomith the son of Josiphiah." See also 1 Esdr. 8:36, where he is called "Assamoth son of Josaphias." See Keil, ad oc.

Shelomoth
Shelomoth was the name of 2 biblical individuals.
 A descendant of Eliezer the son of Moses, put in the duty of temple treasury under David.
 See Shelomith

Shemaiah
See List of people in the Hebrew Bible called Shemaiah

Shemariah

Shemariah is the name of four biblical figures.

In 1 Chronicles 12:5, Shemariah is a Benjamite, one of David's soldiers.

In 2 Chronicles 11:19, Shemariah is one of the sons of Rehoboam, spelled Shamariah in the King James Version.

In Ezra 10:32, Shemariah is one of the "sons of Harim," in a list of men who took foreign wives. Another Shemariah, one of the "descendants of Bani", appears in verse 41.

Shemeber
Shemeber is the king of Zeboiim in Genesis 14 who joins other Canaanite city kings in rebelling against Chedorlaomer.

Shemed

Shemed, spelled Shamed in the King James Version, is a figure briefly listed in 1 Chronicles 8:12 as one of the sons of Elpaal, the son of Shaharaim. He and his two brothers are referred to as "Eber, and Misham, and Shamed, who built Ono, and Lod, with the towns thereof" (1 Chronicles 8:12).

Shemer
Shemer (Hebrew: שמר Shemer "guardian") is the name of three biblical figures.

According to Kings, Shemer was the name of the man from whom Omri, King of Israel, bought Samaria (Hebrew Shomron), which he named after Shemer.

According to 1 Chronicles, one of the Levites involved in the musical ministry of the Jerusalem temple was "Ethan the son of Kishi, the son of Abdi, the son of Malluch, the son of Hashabiah, the son of Amaziah, the son of Hilkiah, the son of Amzi, the son of Bani, the son of Shemer, the son of Mahli, the son of Mushi, the son of Merari, the son of Levi" (1 Chronicles 6:44–47). In this passage, the King James Version spells the name Shamer.

1 Chronicles 7:34 mentions a Shemer as one of the descendants of the Tribe of Asher. In verse 32, this figure is called Shomer, and is the son of Heber, the son of Beriah, the son of Asher.

Shemida
Shemida was a son of Manasseh according to Numbers 26:32, Joshua 17:2, and 1 Chronicles 7:19.

Shemiramoth
Shemiramoth was the name of 2 biblical individuals.
One of the many Levite musicians who played on his harp to prepare the alamoth when King David moved the Ark of the Covenant from the land of Obed-edom to Jerusalem.

Shemuel
Shemuel Prince of the tribe of Simeon; one of those appointed by Moses to superintend the division of Canaan amongst the tribe (Num. 34:20).

Shenazar

Shephatiah
Shephatiah (Hebrew שפטיה) is the name of at least nine Hebrew Bible men:
 Shephatiah the son of David and Abital, David's fifth son, according to II Samuel 3:4.
 Shephatiah the son of Mattan (Jeremiah 38:1) who was among the officers who denounced Jeremiah to king Zedekiah.
 A son of Maakah and the phylarch of the Simeonites in the time of David.
 The youngest of the sons of Jehoshaphat and one of the brothers killed by Joram in the process of being king.
 The father of Amariah and the son of Mahalalel. He was the ancestor of Athaiah of the tribe of Judah.
 The son of Reuel and father of Meshullam the chieftain of the tribe of Benjamin during the exile. (.
 An ancestor of 372 descendants of his who went with Zerubbabel from Babylon. He is identical to the Shephatiah of  whose 80 descendants returned in the rule of Zebadiah and Ezra.
 One of Solomon's servants whose descendants also returned with Zerubbabel from Babylon to Israel.

Shepho

Sheshai
When the Israelites took possession of the land, Sheshai along with Talmai and Ahiman were driven out of the land.

Sheshan
Sheshan is the name of one, or possibly two, biblical characters mentioned in the first book of Chronicles:
 "The son of Ishi was Sheshan, and Sheshan's daughter was Ahlai ... Now Sheshan had no sons, only daughters. And Sheshan had an Egyptian servant whose name was Jarha. Sheshan gave his daughter to Jarha his servant as wife, and she bore him Attai."

Shillem
Shillem was a son of Naphtali according to Genesis 46:24 and Numbers 26:49. He was one of the 70 souls to migrate to Egypt with Jacob.

Shimea
Shimea, according to bible's account, was the name of 2 biblical individuals.
A Merarite as the son of Uzziah, and also the father of Haggish.
The grandfather of Asaph the prophet or seer of the men who ministered with music before the tabernacle, the tent of meeting. He is the father of Asaph's father Berechiah.

Shimeah
The name Shimeah is used for two figures in the Hebrew Bible.
 Shimeah or Shammah was a third son of Jesse, a brother of David (1 Samuel 16:9), and the father of Jonadab (2 Samuel 13:3).
 A figure named Mikloth is the father of Shimeah according to 1 Chronicles 8:32, which gives no further information about either of them but places them in a genealogy of the Tribe of Benjamin. In a parallel passage, 1 Chronicles 9:38 calls this son of Mikloth Shimeam, and presents Mikloth as a son of "Jehiel the father of Gibeon," making Mikloth a great-uncle of the Israelite king Saul.

Shimei

Shimei ( Šīmʿī) is the name of a number of persons referenced in the Hebrew Bible and Rabbinical literature.
The second son of Gershon and grandson of Levi.
A Benjamite of Bahurim, son of Gera, "a man of the family of the house of Saul". He is mentioned as one of David's tormentors during his flight before Absalom, and as imploring and winning David's forgiveness when the latter returned. David, however, in his dying charge to Solomon, bade him avenge the insult. Jewish scribes say that Solomon's teacher was Shimei (son of Gera), and while he lived, he prevented Solomon from marrying foreign wives. The Talmud says at Ber. 8a: "For as long as Shimei the son of Gera was alive Solomon did not marry the daughter of Pharaoh" (see also Midrash Tehillim to Ps. 3:1). Solomon's execution of Shimei was his first descent into sin.
A brother of David, called also Shammah, Shimeah, and Shimea
A friend of King David mentioned in 
Son of Elah, one of Solomon's prefects, over the district of Benjamin
A grandson of Jeconiah and brother of Zerubbabel
A grandson of Simeon, who is described as the father of sixteen sons and six daughters, and whose clan dwelt in Judea
A Reubenite
Levites
A Benjamite chief who had nine sons (R. V.; comp. ib. v. 13)
"The Ramathite," one of David's officers
A Levite and other Israelites whom Ezra required to put away their foreign wives
Grandfather of Mordecai.

Shimi

Shimrath
Shimrath was a Benjaminite, as one of the nine sons of Shimei.

Shimri
The name Shimri appears 3 times in the Hebrew Bible

A son of Shemaiah mentioned in the Book of 1 Chronicles
Shimri the father of Jedaiel and the brother of Joha the Tizite.
One of the two sons of Elizaphan according to 2 Chronicles 29:13.

Shimron
Shimron was a son of Issachar according to Genesis 46:13, Numbers 26:24 and 1 Chronicles 7:1. He was one of the 70 souls to migrate to Egypt with Jacob.

Shimshai
Shimshai was a scribe who was represented the peoples listed in Ezra 4:9–10 in a letter to King Artaxerxes.

Shinab
Shinab is the king of Admah in Genesis 14 who joins other Canaanite city kings in rebelling against Chedorlaomer.

Shiphi
Shiphi was the son of Allon and the father of Ziza mentioned in 1 Chronicles 4:37.

Shiphtan
Shiphtan was the father of Kemuel, a prince of the Tribe of Ephraim. (Num. 34:24).

Shisha
Shisha (Hebrew – שישא) was the father of Elihoreph and Ahijah, who were scribes of King Solomon (1 Kings 4:3).

Shobab
Shobab שובב "Mischievous" is the name of two figures in the Hebrew Bible.
In Brenton's Septuagint Translation, his name is translated as "Sobab" and his mother's name is given as "Bersabee". Each reference to him mentions him briefly, in a list along with at least three other sons of David born in Jerusalem (2 Samuel 5:14; 1 Chronicles 3:5, 14:4).
 Shobab is mentioned in 1 Chronicles 2:18 as one of the children of Caleb, son of Hezron (not to be confused with the more famous Caleb son of Jephunneh).

Shobal
Shobal was a Horite chief in the hill country of Seir during the days of Esau. He was a son of Seir the Horite, and his sons were Alvas, Manahath, Ebal, Shepho and Onam.

Shuni
Shuni was a son of Gad according to  Genesis 46:16 and Numbers 26:15. He was one of the 70 persons to migrate to Egypt with Jacob.

Shuthelah
Shuthelah was a son of Ephraim according to Numbers 26:35 and 1 Chronicles 7:20.

Sisamai
Sisamai was the son of Eleasah and the father of Shallum mentioned in 1 Chronicles 2:40.

Sodi
Sodi of the house of Zebulun was the father of Gaddiel, a scout sent to Canaan prior to the crossing of the Jordan River according to Numbers 13:10.

Sotai
Sotai was a descendant of the servants of Solomon, and his own descendants were listed among those who returned from the Babylonian exile in Ezra 2:55.

Susi
Susi of the house of Manasseh was the father of Gaddi, a scout sent to Canaan prior to the crossing of the Jordan River according to Numbers 13:11.

T

Tahan
Tahan was a son of Ephraim according to Numbers 26:35 and 1 Chronicles 7:25.

Tahash

Tahath
There are 3 people named Tahath in the Hebrew Bible.
Tahath a descendant of Korah and an ancestor of Samuel according to 

Taphath
Taphath (Hebrew טפת, "Drop") was a daughter of Solomon and wife of one of her father's twelve regional administrators, the son of Abinadab (First Kings 4:11).

Tebah
Tebah (Hebrew: טבח, "Massacre") was a son of Nahor, son of Terah and his concubine Reumah.

Tekoa
The name Tekoahis also the name of a place which the Prophet Amos was born.

Temeni
Temeni is described in the Bible as a son of Naarah and Ashhur the son of Hezron the Grandson of Judah the founder of the tribe. He was the brother of Haahashtari, Ahuzam, and Hepher according to 1 Chronicles 4:6.

Tirhanah
Tirhanah according to the Biblical Narrative was the son of Caleb the son of Hezron. He was the son of Caleb's concubine named Maachah, and also the brother of Shaaph and Sheber.

Tola
Tola was the name of two individuals mentioned in the Bible:
 A son of Issachar according to Genesis 46:13, Numbers 26:23 and 1 Chronicles 7:1. He was one of the 70 souls to migrate to Egypt with Jacob.
 Tola (biblical figure), also of the tribe of Issachar, one of the judges of Israel (Judges 10:1–2).

U

Uel 
In  : "Of the sons of Bani; Maadai, Amram, and Uel."

Ulam 
Ulam is a name that appears twice in the Hebrew Bible. In 1 Chronicles 7:16–17, an Ulam appears in a genealogical passage as the son of Peresh, the son of Machir, the son of the patriarch Manasseh. In 1 Chronicles 8:39, an Ulam appears in a genealogy as the son of Eshek, the brother of Azel, the son of Eleasah, the son of Raphah, the son of Binea, the son of Moza, the son of Zimri, the son of Jehoadah, the son of Ahaz, the son of Micah, the son of Meribbaal.

Uri 
Uri is mentioned 7 times, 6 of which indicate that another figure is the "son of Uri". The meaning of the name in English is "my light", "my flame" or "illumination".
 Uri (Hebrew: אוּרִי) is mentioned in Exodus 31 and 1 Chronicles 2 as a member of the Tribe of Judah.  He is the son of Hur (Hebrew: חור) and the father of Bezalel (Hebrew: בצלאל).
 Another Uri (Hebrew: אוּרִי) is mentioned in Ezra 10 as one of those who have taken "strange wives."

Uriel
Uriel a Archangel

Urijah son of Shemaiah
Urijah, son of Shemaiah (Hebrew: אוּרִיָּהוּ בֵּנ–שְׁמַעְיָהוּ ʾŪrīyyāhū ben-Šəmaʿyāhū) was a minor prophet mentioned in Jeremiah 26:20-23. He was from Kiriath-Jearim, and his prophecies often matched Jeremiah's criticisms. When Jehoiakim heard the reports of these prophecies, he sent to have him killed, but Urijah fled to Egypt. In response, Jehoiakim sent a group of men, including Elnathan son of Achbor – the future father-in-law to his son, Jeconiah – to bring him back. After being brought before the king, he was executed, and buried in a potter's field.

Urijah
Urijah (Hebrew: אוריה uriyah) a priest in the time of King Ahaz of Judah, built an altar at the temple in Jerusalem on the Damascene model for Tiglathpileser, king of Assyria.  II Kings 16:10–16

Uz
Uz was the name of 3 biblical characters in the Bible:

V

Vaizatha 
Haman had planned to kill all the Jews living under the reign of King Ahasuerus, but his plot was foiled. In their defence, the Jews killed 500 men in the citadel of Susa, as well as Vaizatha and his nine brothers: this event is remembered in the Jewish festival Purim. Walther Hinz has proposed that the name is a rendering of an Old Iranian name, Vahyazzāta, which itself is derived from Vahyaz-dāta ("given from the best one"), as found in Aramaic, Elamite, and Akkadian sources.

Vaniah
Vaniah, meaning nourishment, or weapons, of the Lord; one of many sons of Bani named in Ezra 10:36.

Vophsi
Vophsi of the house of Naphtali was the father of Nahbi, a scout sent to Canaan prior to the crossing of the Jordan River according to Numbers 13:14.

Z

Zaavan 
Zaavan (za'-a-van or za'-awan), son of Ezer, was a Horite chief in the Land of Edom.

Zabad
Zabad is the name of seven men in the Hebrew Bible.
 In 1 Chronicles 2:36–37, Zabad is a member of the Tribe of Judah, the family of Hezron and the house of Jahahmeel. He was the son of Nathan and the father of Ephlal.
 In 1 Chronicles 7:21, Zabad is an Ephraimite of the family of Shuthelah. He was the son of Tanath and the father of Suthelah.
 In 1 Chronicles 11:41, Zabad is one of King David's mighty men. He is the son of Ahlai.
 In 2 Chronicles 24:26, Zabad is one of two servants of King Joash who kill him in his bed. He is the son of Shimeath, an Amonite woman. In 2 Kings 12:21 this same man seems to be called Jozachar. His fellow conspirator is Jehozabad, the son of Shomer.
 In Ezra 10:27,33,34, three men named Zabad are listed as having taken foreign wives, whom Ezra persuades them to send away.

Zabdi
Zabdi, son of Zerah, of the Tribe of Judah, was the father of Carmi and the grandfather of Achan, according to Joshua 7:1. He was present at the Battle of Jericho.

Zabud
Zabud  (Hebrew – זבוד, zābud, meaning "endowed.") was a priest and friend of King Solomon, according to 1 Kings 4:5. He is described as the "son of Nathan," but it is unclear whether this is Nathan the prophet or Nathan the son of David. As a "friend" of the king, he probably served the function of a counselor.

Zaccur
Zaccur of the house of Reuben was the father of Shammua, a scout sent to Canaan prior to the crossing of the Jordan River according to Numbers 13:4.

Zalmon 
Zalmon the Ahohite, according to 2 Samuel 23:28 in the Masoretic Text, is listed as one of David's Mighty Warriors. In the Masoretic Text of 1 Chronicles 11:29, in another copy of the same list of warriors, he is called "Ilai the Ahohite." Where the Masoretic Text has "Zalmon," various manuscripts of the Greek Septuagint have Ellon, Sellom, or Eliman. And where the Masoretic Text has "Ilai," the Septuagint reads Elei, Eli, or Ela.

Zaza 

Zebadiah
Zebadiah (cf. Zebedee) may refer to:
 A son of Asahel, Joab's brother.
 A Levite who took part as one of the teachers in the system of national education instituted by Jehoshaphat.
 The son of Ishmael, "the ruler of the house of Judah in all the king's matters".
 A son of Beriah.
 A Korhite porter of the Lord's house. Three or four others of this name are also mentioned.

Zebudah
Zebudah was the first wife of King Josiah who bore him Jehoiakim. She is mentioned in these passages: . She was the daughter of Pedaiah of Rumah.

Zechariah
Zechariah was the name of 18 minor biblical individuals.

In addition to the characters named above, there are numerous minor characters in the Bible with the same name:
 A prophet, who had "understanding in the seeing of God," in the time of Uzziah, who was much indebted to him for his wise counsel: .
 One of the chiefs of the tribe of Reuben: .
 One of the porters of the tabernacle: .
 .
 A Levite who assisted at the bringing up of the ark from the house of Obed-edom: .
 A Kohathite Levite: .
 A Merarite Levite: .
 The father of Iddo: .
 One who assisted in teaching the law to the people in the time of Jehoshaphat: .
 A Levite of the sons of Asaph: .
 One of Jehoshaphat's sons: .
 The father of Abijah (queen), who was the mother of Hezekiah:  possibly the same as Isaiah's supporter Zechariah the son of Jeberechiah .
 One of the sons of Asaph: .
 One of the "rulers of the house of God": .
 .
 .
 .

Zedekiah
(Hebrew צִדְקִיָּה tsidqiyah)
 Zedekiah, King of Judah
 Zedekiah, son of Chenaanah, a false prophet in the time of Kings Jehoshaphat and Ahab
 Zedekiah, son of Maaseiah, who, according to Jeremiah 29:21, was a false prophet.
 Zedekiah the son of Hananiah, one of the princes to whom Michaiah told of Jeremiah's prophecy – Jeremiah 36:12
Not to be confused with his uncle King Zedekiah.

Zephaniah
Zephaniah (Hebrew צפניה, pronounced TsePhNiYaH) was the name of at least three people in the Bible:
 Zephaniah the prophet (q.v.)
 Zephaniah the son of Maaseiah the priest in Jeremiah 29:25.  A member of the deputation sent by King Zedekiah to Jeremiah (Jeremiah 21:1; 37:3).  "He is probably the same Zephaniah who is called 'the second priest' in 52:24 ... and was among those executed after the capture of Jerusalem in 587 B.C.  In the present situation he is overseer of the temple (vs. 26), occupying the position which had been held earlier by Pashur, who had put Jeremiah in stocks..."
Zephaniah also called Uriel which was the son of Tahath and the father of Uzziah or Azariah according to

Zephon 
See Ziphion.

Zerah
See Zohar.

Zerahiah
Zerahiah was a High Priest and a ancestor of Zadok, he was the son of Uzzi and the father of Meraioth. He is mentioned in 

Zeri 
See Izri.

Zeror
Zeror, son of Bechorath, of the tribe of Benjamin, was the great-grandfather of King Saul and of his commander Abner. According to Saul, his family was the least of the tribe of Benjamin. (1 Samuel 9)

Zichri
Zichri was a son of Izhar of the house of Levi according to Exodus 6:21, born in Egypt. He was a nephew of Amram and a cousin of Aaron, Miriam, and Moses. Zichri was also the name of the father of Amasiah, one of Jehoshaphat's commanders according to 2 Chron 17:16.

Zidkijah
Zidkijah is mentioned in chapter 10 of Nehemiah.

Zillah
In , Zillah ( – Ṣillāh) is a wife of Lamech and the mother of Tubal-cain and Naamah.

Ziphah 
In , Ziphah (zī'fe) is mentioned as a son of Jehaleleel, a  descendant of Judah.

Zippor
Zippor was the father of Balak, a prophet of Jehovah in Moab, in Numbers 22. He was a descendant of Moab, the son of Lot.

Ziphion
Ziphion or Zephon is a son of Gad, and was the progenitor of the Zephonites. There may be a connection with the angel Zephon.

Zithri 
In , Zithri ("the Lord protects"), a Levite, was the son of Uzziel.

Ziza
Ziza (or Zizah) was the name of 3 biblical individuals:
A Gershonite, the second son of Shimei (1 Chronicles 23:10–11). The spelling is according to the Septuagint; most Hebrew manuscripts have Zina.

Zobebah
Zobebah (also known as Hazzobebah) was a son of Koz (1 Chronicles 4:8).

Zohar
For the Zohar found in a variant reading of 1 Chronicles 4:7, see Izhar.

Zohar or Zerah was a son of Simeon according to  Genesis 46:10, Exodus 6:15, and Numbers 26:13. He was one of the 70 souls to migrate to Egypt with Jacob.

Zoheth
Zoheth was a son of Ishi.

Zuar
Zuar was a member of the house of Issachar according to Numbers 1:8. He was the father of Nethaneel.

Zuph
He is listed as being a Ephraimite even though he came from the line of Levi.

Zuriel 
Zuriel  ("My Rock is God") was the son of Abihail. A Levite, Zuriel was chief prince of the Merarites at the time of the Exodus.

Zurishaddai 
In , Rock of the Almighty ("Shaddai is my rock") was the father of Shelumiel, the prince of the Tribe of Simeon. He is mentioned in this context five times in the Book of Numbers.

See also 
 List of biblical names
 List of burial places of biblical figures
 List of major biblical figures
 List of minor biblical tribes

References 

 
minor L